This is the discography of the English progressive rock band, Big Big Train. To date, the band have released thirteen studio albums, two demos, three EPs, and three live albums.

Studio albums

Live albums

Compilation albums

Videos

Demo albums and EPs

'Stay Tuned' Single Series

Notes

References

Discographies of British artists
Rock music group discographies